White habitus is a pattern of socialization among white people that excludes black people and their culture, created as a result of racial segregation.

Colorblind racism can be seen as a product of white habitus.

References

See also 
 Systemic racism

Race and society